Mudar Zahran (born 19 April 1973) is a Jordanian Palestinian who has been described as the secretary general of the alleged Jordanian Opposition Coalition. In 2010, Zahran moved to live in the United Kingdom. In 2014, Zahran was indicted by a Jordanian military court on four separate charges against him after he wrote articles describing Jordan to be an apartheid state resembling that of South Africa in its treatment of Palestinians. 

In September 2019, due to "security reasons", he was denied entry into Israel where he was scheduled to meet with right-wing and settler leaders. The Jerusalem Post reported that Zahran had faced accusations by some in Israel (including columnists Ruthie Blum and Dr Harold Rhode, the Posts writer Caroline Glick and the Elder of Ziyon blog) of being a "fraud" and that his so-called the "Jordan Opposition Coalition" is only present on the internet without a real backing in Jordan.

Biography
Born on 19 April 1973, Zahran is a Jordanian national writer of Palestinian origin. Zahran's parents were born in Jerusalem, and moved to Jordan during the period when the West Bank was under Jordanian control (1950–1967). He has two master's degrees and was reported in 2012 to have been completing a Ph.D in finance. Before seeking asylum in the UK, Zahran was serving as assistant policy coordinator at the United States Embassy in Amman.

In 2010, Zahran wrote an article in The Jerusalem Post that described Jordan as an apartheid state in its treatment against Palestinians; he also claims the Jordanian state resembles that of former apartheid South Africa. The article provoked an uproar of criticism by both Jordanians and Palestinians alike. Shortly after the article was published, Mudar sent a letter of apology through Ammon News after his father Adnan Zahran threatened to cut off relations if the former wrote anything else and considered Mudar's continuation of writing as "ingratitude" on a personal level against his father, and as an "ungratefulness" towards Jordan. The father described Mudar's writings as far from truth and reality. Mudar vowed through the letter dating 26 July 2010 to "not publish any articles or reports in any language related to Jordanian domestic or foreign affairs." He continued: "This decision comes because of I have sensed clearly that my articles are being misunderstood and exploited by some against my precious country whether by ill intention or misunderstanding."

After leaving Amman to live in the United Kingdom in 2010, a local gazette published an announcement on 31 May 2011 by Amman's Magistrates' court calling on Mudar to present himself at court for a lawsuit filed against him by the HSBC bank branch in Jordan. The announcement said he was called for failing to repay the bank amounts totaling up to 47,000 Jordanian dinars (about US$66,000).

He told The Times of Israel in 2012, "The King  (Abdullah II) is not going to survive, it's out of the question... I give him until next summer, more or less. And even if I am wrong, I can't see the King making it to 2014 by any stretch."

In December 2013, Zahran was charged by a Jordanian military court and scheduled to be tried in absentia for four separate charges against him: "inciting hatred against the regime, sectarian strife and insulting the king as well as security services." According to the Jordanian newspaper Al Ghad, "Zahran's social networking sites carry articles and phrases offensive to Jordan and his own people (Palestinians)." In February 2014, The Jerusalem Post reported that Zahran had been convicted and sentenced in absentia to jail with hard labor. The reports concerning the length of his sentence differed, with AFP reporting earlier that he might face up to 15 years.

According to The Jerusalem Post'''s deputy managing  editor Caroline Glick, she was contacted by three of her acquaintances in October 2017 who discouraged her from writing in support of Zahran. "They did not coordinate their calls. Each one told me independently that Zahran is not a credible source. He is not a leader of an opposition movement. He doesn't have an organization. He has multiple websites, they said..." Her sentiment was shared by other Israeli right-wing writers and publications including the Elder of Ziyon blog.

On 17 September 2019, he was banned from entering Israel where he was scheduled to meet with far-right and settler Israeli leaders. The Israeli Interior Ministry said that the ban was denied due to "security reasons". The Jerusalem Post reported that Mudar faced accusations by some in Israel (including columnists Ruthie Blum and Dr Harold Rhode, the Posts writer Caroline Glick and the Elder of Ziyon blog) that he is a "fraud" and that his so-called "Jordan Opposition Coalition" only has a presence on the internet with no real backing in Jordan.

Personal life
Zahran lives in London and has two daughters and a son.

Notes

References

External links
Zahran's articles in The Jerusalem Post''

1973 births
Living people
Jordanian activists
Jordanian people of Palestinian descent
Refugees in the United Kingdom
The Jerusalem Post people